Ali Abdi may refer to:
Ali Abdi Farah (born 1947), Djiboutian politician
Ali A. Abdi (born 1955), Canadian sociologist
Ali Abdi Aware (born 1957), Somali politician
Ali Abdi (footballer) (born 1993), Tunisian footballer
Ali Shido Abdi, Somali politician
Ali Abdi Farah (football manager), Somali football manager
Ali Mohamud Abdi, Somali politician
Ali Abdi (engineer), American engineer
Ali Ahmed Abdi (died 2012), Somali journalist